Annika Zeyen (born 17 February 1985) is a former 1.5-point wheelchair basketball player, who has played for ASV Bonn, RSV Lahn-Dill and BG Baskets Hamburg in the German wheelchair basketball league, and for the University of Alabama in the United States. She has represented her country a total of 382  times in which she won six European titles, was the runner-up at 2010 and 2014 World Championships, won silver medals at the 2008 Summer Paralympic Games in Beijing and 2016 Summer Paralympics in Rio de Janeiro, and won a gold medal at the 2012 Summer Paralympics in London, for which President Joachim Gauck awarded the team Germany's highest sporting honour, the Silbernes Lorbeerblatt (Silver Laurel Leaf).
Following the Rio 2016 Paralympic Games, Zeyen retired from wheelchair basketball to pursue alternative sporting challenges as an individual athlete.

Biography
Zeyen was born on 17 February 1985. She is nicknamed "Anni". At the age of 14, she was involved in a serious horse riding accident that left her paralysed. During rehab, she was introduced to the sport of wheelchair basketball. She left the hospital and started looking for a club where she could play.

Wheelchair Basketball 
Zeyen joined ASV Bonn, initially playing with the youth team, then with the seconds, and finally with the firsts. In 2001, she played in the German Championships for Women, and was named most valuable young player. In 2004, she switched to RSV Lahn-Dill, with which she won several German championships. She was invited to try out for the national team, and joined its development squad. She competed in her first paralympic games, the 2004 Summer Paralympics in Athens. She subsequently played for the national team that won the European championships in 2005, 2007, 2009 and 2011.

In September 2008, Zeyen participated in the 2008 Summer Paralympics in Beijing, but Germany was beaten in the gold medal match by the United States team,  which contained three of her former teammates from the University of Alabama, Stephanie Wheeler, Mary Allison Milford and Alana Nichols. The German team took home Paralympic silver medals instead. After the Paralympics, the team's performance was considered impressive enough for it to be named the national "Team of the Year", and it received the Silver Laurel Leaf, Germany's highest sporting honour, from German President Horst Koehler.

Zeyen took up a scholarship to the University of Alabama in 2009, majoring in advertising and minoring in graphic design. She maintained a 4.0 grade point average. Her team at the University of Alabama won three titles in five years, narrowly missing out in March 2013 to the University of Wisconsin–Whitewater, which won the championship game 55–41, a game in which Zeyen scored 11 points. Zeyen was named an Academic All-American in 2012 and 2013.

In June 2012, Zeyen was named as one of the team that competed at the 2012 Summer Paralympic Games in London. In the Gold Medal match, her team faced Australia, a team that had defeated them 48–46 in Sydney just a few months before. They defeated the Australians 58–44 in front of a crowd of over 12,000 at the North Greenwich Arena to win the gold medal, the first that Germany had won in women's wheelchair basketball in 28 years. They were awarded a Silver Laurel Leaf by President Joachim Gauck in November 2012, and were again named Team of the Year for 2012.

The German team lost the European Championship to the Netherlands before a home town crowd of 2,300 in Frankfurt in July 2013 by a point, 56–57. The game was televised live in Germany, and cameras lingered on a tearful Zeyen, who could have tied the game and sent it into extra time with a free throw in its dying moments.

In April 2014, Zeyen was part of the BG Baskets Hamburg team that won the International Wheelchair Basketball Federation Euro League Challenge Cup, its first International title, with a 62–54 over the Frankfurt Mainhatten Skywheelers. The team also won the Fair Play Award of the International Wheelchair Basketball Federation Europe, and Zeyen was elected to its All Star team.

The German team claimed silver at the 2014 Women's World Wheelchair Basketball Championship in Toronto, Ontario, Canada, and beat the Netherlands in the 2015 European Championships, to claim its tenth European title. At the 2016 Paralympic Games, it won silver after losing the final to the United States.  Zeyen was selected as the German flag bearer in the closing ceremony.

Wheelchair Athletics 
Following the completion of the 2016 Games, Zeyen decided to retire from wheelchair basketball to pursue a career in wheelchair athletics. She won every race she competed in at the German national championships in May 2017, setting new national records in the 800m, 1,500m and 5,000m, and qualifying for the 2017 World Championships in London after only six months in the sport. Later that year she finished 6th in the TCS New York Marathon in a time of 2:07:23.

Handbiking 
In January 2019, Zeyen switched her focus to hand-biking under her wheelchair athletics coach, Alois Gmeiner. She is classified as an H3 athlete.

In her first year competing she finished runner up in her first World Cup Road Race in Baie-Comeau, Canada and ended the season ranked 4th in the world in her classification.

As a result of this impressive first competitive season, Zeyen was selected for the German National team to compete at the 2019 Para-cycling Road World Championships in Emmen, Netherlands.

Zeyen was selected to compete in the individual time trial and road race as well as the mixed relay team alongside Vico Merklein (H3M) and Bernd Jeffre (H4M). The team finished third after the Spanish team were penalized time for forcing Merklein off the road on the final corner of the race. This victory guaranteed a place for the German team in the relay at the 2020 Paralympic Games in Tokyo, Japan.

On 15 September 2019, Zeyen competed in the Women's H3 Road Race at the World Championships and took home the rainbow jersey and was crowned World Champion at her first attempt, beating pre-race favorite Alica Dana from the United States by a little over 1 second. Annika completed the 51.8 km race in a time of 1 hour 37 minutes and 41 seconds.

Due to COVID-19 pandemic, there were no sanctioned races in 2020 however Zeyen returned to competition in June 2021 at the UCI Para-cycling Road World Championships at the Circuito EsTirol in Cascais, Portugal. She competed in the team relay along with Vico Merklein (H3M) and Bernd Jeffre (H4M) as well as the individual time trial and road race (H3W). Annika was out to defend her road race rainbow jersey she won in two years earlier.

On 9 June 2021, the German team finished the third in the mixed team relay and took the bronze medal behind Italy and Spain. Zeyen was the only female on the podium. The team completed the 17.82 km course in  a time of 24 minutes and 7 seconds - 38 seconds behind first place.

On 11 June 2021, Annika switched focus to the individual competitions with the H3W Time Trial. Zeyen completed the 16.8 km course in a time of 28 minutes and 59 seconds taking the silver medal behind Francesca Porcellato from Italy.

Two days later, Zeyen competed in the Women's H3 Road Race at the looking to retain her rainbow jersey. In an extremely close race, Annika beat Francesca Porcellato by less than 1 second. Annika completed the 58.8 km race in a time of 1 hour 50 minutes and 56 seconds.

Achievements

Wheelchair Basketball 

2005: Gold at European championships (Villeneuve d'Ascq, France)
2006: Bronze at World Championships (Amsterdam, Netherlands)
2007: Gold at European championships (Wetzlar, Germany)
2008: Silver at the Paralympic Games (Beijing, China)
2009: Gold at the European Championships (Stoke Mandeville, England)
2010: Silver at the World Championships
2011: Gold at the European Championships (Nazareth, Israel)
2012: Gold at the Paralympic Games (London, England)
2013: Silver at the European Championships (Frankfurt, Germany) 
2014: Silver at the World Championships (Toronto, Canada) 
 2015: Gold at the European Championships (Worcester, England) 
 2016: Silver at the Paralympic Games (Rio de Janeiro, Brazil)

Hand-biking 
2019: Gold - UCI Paracycling World Road Championships - H3 Women Road Race (Emmen, Netherlands)
2019: Silver - UCI Paracycling World Cup Road Race - H3 Women (Baie-Comeau, Canada)
2019: Bronze - UCI Paracycling World Road Championships - Mixed Relay (Emmen, Netherlands)
2021: Gold - UCI Paracycling World Road Championships - H3 Women Road Race (Cascais, Portugal)
2021: Silver - UCI Paracycling World Road Championships - H3 Women Time Trial (Cascais, Portugal)
2021: Bronze - UCI Paracycling World Road Championships - Mixed Relay (Cascais, Portugal)
2021: Gold - Paralympic Games - H3 Women Time Trial (Tokyo, Japan)

Awards and recognition
2008: Team of the Year
2008: Silver Laurel Leaf
2012: Team of the Year
2012: Silver Laurel Leaf

On 7 January 2020, Zeyen was invited by Bonn Mayor Ashok Sridharan to sign the City of Bonn 'Golden Book'.

Introduced in 1926, the Golden Book  is a time-lapse; recording the extent to which the Federal Republic of Germany has gained international renown by including well-known personalities from around the world and locally who have shaped the city and contributed to Bonn's reputation.

Signing the book is considered to be the highest honour someone from Bonn can receive. Zeyen's signature now sits alongside those of Pope John Paul II, Queen Elizabeth II and the Dalai Lama and she is the first Paralympian to sign the book.

Notes

External links
 
 

1985 births
Living people
Sportspeople from Bonn
German women's wheelchair basketball players
Paralympic wheelchair basketball players of Germany
Wheelchair basketball players at the 2012 Summer Paralympics
Wheelchair basketball players at the 2008 Summer Paralympics
Wheelchair basketball players at the 2004 Summer Paralympics
Medalists at the 2008 Summer Paralympics
Medalists at the 2012 Summer Paralympics
Medalists at the 2016 Summer Paralympics
Medalists at the 2020 Summer Paralympics
Wheelchair basketball players at the 2016 Summer Paralympics
Cyclists at the 2020 Summer Paralympics
Paralympic gold medalists for Germany
Paralympic silver medalists for Germany
Recipients of the Silver Laurel Leaf
Paralympic medalists in wheelchair basketball
Alabama Crimson Tide athletes
German expatriate sportspeople in the United States
Paralympic cyclists of Germany
20th-century German women
21st-century German women